Ubberud is a village west of Odense, in Funen, Denmark. It is the birthplace of the Danish singer MØ and Danish International Football coach Richard Møller Nielsen.

References

Suburbs of Odense
Populated places in Funen